Tango Bar is a 1987 Argentine-Puerto Rican musical drama film directed by Marcos Zurinaga and starring Raul Julia, Rubén Juárez and Valeria Lynch. It was written by Zurinaga with Juan Carlos Codazzi and José Pablo Feinmann. It was selected as the Puerto Rican entry for the Best Foreign Language Film at the 61st Academy Awards, but was not accepted as a nominee.

Synopsis
A popular Tango venue in Buenos Aires, Argentina is run by two friends: Antonio Estévez, an Argentine musician and bandoneon player and Ricardo Padin, a Puerto Rican poet and pianist. Elena, who is Antonio's wife, begins a romantic relationship with the Ricardo when Antonio decides to go into exile from his country due to the oppressive climate of the penultimate Argentine civic-military dictatorship (1966-1973), while Elena and Ricardo choose to stay. Years later, with the return of Democracy from 1983 onwards, Antonio returns to his country with the desire to reunite with Ricardo, Elena and the world of tango. But the reunion only awakes conflicts and revolutionized feelings.

Cast
 Raul Julia as Ricardo Padin
 Valeria Lynch as Elena
 Rubén Juárez as Antonio
 Carlos Gardel as himself
 Rudolph Valentino as himself
 Stan Laurel as himself
 Oliver Hardy as himself

See also
 List of submissions to the 61st Academy Awards for Best Foreign Language Film
 List of Puerto Rican submissions for the Academy Award for Best Foreign Language Film

References

External links
 

1987 films
1987 drama films
1980s musical drama films
Argentine musical drama films
Puerto Rican films
1980s Spanish-language films
Tango films